Dan Zaneski (September 21, 1945 – October 14, 2015) was an American football coach. He served as the head football coach at Plymouth State University in Plymouth, Massachusetts from 1978 to 1979 and Maryville College in Maryville, Tennessee in 1980, compiling a career college football coaching record of 11–18.

Head coaching record

College

References

1945 births
2015 deaths
Central Connecticut Blue Devils football players
Maryville Scots football coaches
Plymouth State Panthers football coaches
High school football coaches in Connecticut
People from New London, Connecticut
Players of American football from Connecticut
Junior college football coaches in the United States